Lana Del Rey is an American singer-songwriter. She began writing songs at the age of 18, and started performing in nightclubs in Brooklyn, New York City. After meeting Van Wilson, an A&R executive for the independent label 5 Points Records, at a songwriting competition, she signed a record deal with the label in 2007, and began working with the producer David Kahne. Together, they composed her debut extended play, Kill Kill, which was released in 2008, and her debut studio album, Lana Del Ray, which was shelved initially, and eventually released in 2010. Three months after the release of Lana Del Rey, Del Rey met her current managers, Ben Mawson and Ed Millett, who helped her break off her contract with 5 Points Records, where, in her opinion, "nothing was happening". Shortly after, she moved to London and lived with Mawson "for a few years".

In 2011, Del Rey was signed by Stranger Records and released her debut single, "Video Games". The song won the Ivor Novello Award for Best Contemporary Song. Her second single "Born to Die" won the UK Music Video Award for Best International Pop Video in 2012. Born to Die, Del Rey's second studio album, was released in early 2012, and was the year's fifth best-selling album worldwide. As of June 2014, it has sold more than seven million copies. She won the Brit Award for International Breakthrough Act, the Q Award for Next Big Thing, and the GQ Award for Woman of the Year in 2012. In late 2012, Born to Die was re-packaged with the extended play, Paradise, as Born to Die: The Paradise Edition.

In 2013, Del Rey won the Brit Award for International Female Solo Artist, as well as the Echo Awards for Best International Female Artist Rock/Pop and Best International Newcomer. She also recorded the song "Young and Beautiful" for the soundtrack of the 2013 film adaptation of F. Scott Fitzgerald's The Great Gatsby, which won the Satellite Award for Best Original Song. At the 2015 MTV Europe Music Awards, Del Rey won the MTV Europe Music Award for Best Alternative. In November 2015, Del Rey received the Trailblazer Award at the Billboard Women in Music ceremony. In December 2021, Del Rey has been recognized with the Variety's Decade Award at the Variety Hitmakers Awards. She's also the first woman who'll receive Visionary Award in upcoming Billboard Women in Music Awards 2023. In total, she has won 32 awards from 96 nominations.

Awards and nominations

Notes

References 

Awards
Del Rey, Lana